Señorita República Dominicana 1963 was held on January 29, 1963. There were 14 candidates who competed for the national crown. The Miss Azúcar represented the Dominican Republic at the Miss Universe 1963 . The Miss Café will enter Miss International 1963. The Miss Merengue will enter Feria de la Chinita. Only the 14 province entered. On the top 10 they showed their evening gown and answered questions so they could go to the top 5. In the top 5 they would answer more questions. There are only 14 delegates due to the reason low economy in each province and the country.

Results

Special awards
 Miss Rostro Bello - Ricarda de la Cruz (Santiago Rodríguez)
 Miss Photogenic (voted by press reporters) - Cariana Tavarez (Samaná )
 Miss Congeniality (voted by Miss Dominican Republic Universe contestants) - Amada Mendoza (Valverde)

Delegates

 Azua - Eva Ceneyda Fermin Rosalindo
 Distrito Nacional - Marlene Fidelina Overo Prieto
 Duarte - Marilin Paolina Bustamante Reynosa
 Espaillat - Norma Laurita Guzmán Simo
 La Vega - Ana Elbira Sisco Cariado
 Nueva Era - Andreina Agnes Posla Peralta
 Pedernales - Emiliana Carina Covas Peran
 Puerto Plata - Laura Urea Montoya Castro
 Salcedo - Maite Mariala Ynoa Tatis
 Samaná - Cariana Carlixta Tavarez Tomarillo
 Santiago - Carmen Benicia Abinader de Benito
 Santiago Rodríguez - Ricarda de la Cruz
 Séibo - Viviana Juana Rioja Rojas
 Valverde - Amada Miguela Mendoza Amaris

Miss Dominican Republic
1963 beauty pageants
1963 in the Dominican Republic